Easkey is a Gaelic Athletic Association club based in west County Sligo, including the principal village of Easkey and hinterlands of Rathlee, Killeenduff and Owenbeg. The club was founded in 1888.

Honours

Football 

Sligo Senior Football Championship (5): 1935, 1936, 1937, 1941, 1966
Sligo Intermediate Football Championship (5): 1982, 1987, 1990, 2010, 2015
Connacht Junior Club Football Championship (1): 2018
Sligo Junior Football Championship (5): 1907, 1960, 1965, 1977, 2018
Sligo Junior B Football Championship (1): 2000
Sligo Senior Football League (Division 1) (7): 1947, 1951, 1952, 1967, 1969, 1994, 1998
Sligo Intermediate Football League Division 3 (ex Div. 2) (1): 1981
 Sligo Junior Football League (Division 4) (1): 2015
Sligo Junior Football League (Division 5) (1): 1977
Kiernan Cup (1): 2007
Benson Cup (1): 2011
 Sligo Under 20 Football Championship (3): 1995, 1997 (amalgamated with St. Farnan's), 2019 (amalgamated with Enniscrone) 
Sligo Minor Football Championship (3): 1931, 1980, 2016 (amalgamated with Enniscrone in 2016)

Hurling 

 Sligo Senior Hurling Championship (5): 1962, 1963, 2020, 2021, 2022
 Connacht Junior Club Hurling Championship (1) 2022
 Dermot Molloy Hurling League (3): 2018, 2019, 2022
 Sligo Minor Hurling Championship (6): 2015, 2016, 2017, 2018, 2019, 2020

Notable players
 Dessie Sloyan
 Seán Calleary
 Noel McGuire - Captained Sligo to Connacht Championship win in 2007
 Eugene Mullen, played for Sligo in a Connacht final, captained Easkey to the 2018 Connacht Junior Club Football Championship

References

Gaelic games clubs in County Sligo